Emma Greenwell (born January 14, 1989) is an American-born English actress. She made her acting debut as Mandy Milkovich in the second season of the Showtime comedy-drama Shameless (2012–2016), appearing as a series regular in the third and fourth seasons. Greenwell also appeared as a series regular on the Hulu drama The Path (2016–2018) and headlined the Starz miniseries The Rook in 2019.

Personal life
Greenwell was born in Greenwich, Connecticut, to a French mother and an English father. The family moved back to London's South Kensington neighbourhood before her second birthday. She attended the London Academy of Music and Dramatic Art for a year. Greenwell said it was good, but it made her realise she did not want to go to drama school before trying her luck at a pilot season in Los Angeles, California. Shameless, the Emmy-winning Showtime drama, was her first job. She booked it when she was 22. Prior to that she was planning on returning to London. Booking Shameless forced her to rent a car and find an apartment, so she did not return to London for nine months.

Greenwell is married and the couple have a child together.

Filmography

Film

Television

References

External links

1989 births
21st-century American actresses
American film actresses
American television actresses
Living people
Actresses from New York (state)
American emigrants to England
English people of French descent
21st-century English actresses
English film actresses
English television actresses
Actresses from London
Actresses from Greenwich, Connecticut